Nix v. Williams, 467 U.S. 431 (1984), was a U.S. Supreme Court case that created an "inevitable discovery" exception to the exclusionary rule. The exclusionary rule makes most evidence gathered through violations of the Fourth Amendment to the United States Constitution, which protects against unreasonable search and seizure, inadmissible in criminal trials as "fruit of the poisonous tree". In Nix, the Court ruled that evidence that would inevitably have been discovered by law enforcement through legal means remained admissible.

Background 
Robert Williams, an escaped mental patient,  murdered ten-year-old Pamela Powers  after kidnapping her from a YMCA in Des Moines, Iowa, on December 24, 1968. He surrendered to police two days later in another county on the condition that he not be interrogated while being transported back to Urbandale. One of the detectives began a conversation and proposed that Williams reveal where he had left the body before an impending snowfall; Williams agreed and led the detectives to Powers' body. 

Williams was subsequently convicted of the murder, but in Brewer v. Williams (1977), the US Supreme Court ruled that his right to counsel had been violated based on the precedent of Massiah v. United States (1964). Williams' conviction was thereby reversed. Justice Potter Stewart's majority opinion, however, contained a footnote suggesting that the evidence provided by Williams could still be used in a trial:
While neither Williams’ incriminating statements themselves nor any testimony describing his having led the police to the victim’s body can constitutionally be admitted into evidence, evidence of where the body was found and of its condition might well be admissible on the theory that the body would have been discovered in any event, even had incriminating statements not been elicited from Williams. ... In the event that a retrial is instituted, it will be for the state courts in the first instance to determine whether particular items of evidence may be admitted.

Williams then received a second trial, in which his attorneys again moved to suppress all evidence stemming from the interrogation of Williams by the detectives. The judge ruled that Williams' statements to the detectives were inadmissible, but citing Stewart's footnote, ruled that the body was admissible as evidence, as it would have inevitably been discovered by law enforcement. On July 15, 1977, Williams was again convicted of first degree murder.

Decision of the Court 
The appeal of the second trial reached the Supreme Court in 1984. The majority opinion was written by Chief Justice Warren E. Burger, who was joined by Justices Byron White, Harry Blackmun, Lewis F. Powell, Jr., William Rehnquist, and Sandra Day O'Connor. Justices White and Stevens wrote concurring opinions, while Justice William J. Brennan, Jr. wrote a dissent in which he was joined by Thurgood Marshall.

The majority opinion found that an "inevitable discovery exception" to the exclusionary rule was constitutional, noting that such a rule was already standard practice in most state and federal courts. The Court stated that law enforcement was not required to demonstrate that it had violated a defendant's rights in good faith, only that the evidence would have inevitably been found despite the violation. Williams' conviction was thereby upheld. 

Brennan's dissent agreed that an inevitable discovery exception existed, but argued that the burden of proof should be strengthened from the "preponderance of the evidence" required by the majority opinion to "clear and convincing evidence".

See also
List of United States Supreme Court cases by the Burger Court

References

External links

1984 in United States case law
United States Fourth Amendment case law
United States Supreme Court cases
United States Supreme Court cases of the Burger Court